Endotricha sondaicalis is a species of snout moth in the genus Endotricha. It was described by Pieter Cornelius Tobias Snellen in 1880, and is known from Sulawesi.

References

Moths described in 1880
Endotrichini